A remix is an alternated version of a song.

Remixes may refer to:
Remixes (Cristian Castro album), 2000
Remixes (Coldplay EP), 2003
Remixes (Enrique Iglesias album), 1998
Remixes (Four Tet album), 2006
Remixes (Harry and the Potters EP), 2010
Remixes (Headlights album), 2008
Remixes (Luis Fonsi album), 2001
Remixes (Prudence Liew album), 1989
Remixes (Sebastian album), 2008
Remixes (Silversun Pickups EP), 2007
Remixes (Mono Band EP), 2005
Remixes! (Hellogoodbye EP), a 2008 EP by Hellogoodbye
Remixes (The Postmarks EP)
t.A.T.u. Remixes, a remix compilation by pop duo t.A.T.u.
Remixes (t.A.T.u. album), the second remix compilation by pop duo t.A.T.u.
Remixes (Basement Jaxx EP), 2004
Remixes (Phenomenal Handclap Band album), 2010
Remixes (Shakespears Sister album), 2012

See also
The Remixes (disambiguation)
Remix (disambiguation)